Stephanie Hein is an American university professor and politician, and member of the Missouri House of Representatives from the 136th district, representing southeast Springfield. Elected in 2022, she assumed office in January, 2023.

Early life 
Upon graduating from Hartville High School in Hartville, Missouri, Hein received her Bachelor of Science in Hospitality and Business Administration and MBA from Missouri State University, and EdD in Educational Leadership and Policy Analysis from the University of Missouri.

Career 
Hein served as chair for the Springfield Convention and Visitors Bureau, Treasurer International Council on Hotel, Restaurant, and Institutional Education and Capital Campaign Assistant for the Ronald McDonald House, In 2022, Hein became a faculty emeritus at Missouri State University in the department of hospitality in order to focus on her run for the Missouri House. She defeated incumbent Republican Craig Fishel, flipping the seat.

Electoral history

References 

Living people
University of Missouri alumni
Missouri State University alumni
Missouri State University faculty
Year of birth missing (living people)
Missouri Democrats